This is a list of airports in Bahrain, sorted by location.



Airports

See also 
 Transport in Bahrain
 List of airports by ICAO code: O#OB - Bahrain
 Wikipedia: WikiProject Aviation/Airline destination lists: Asia#Bahrain

References 
 
  – includes IATA codes
 Airport records for Bahrain at Landings.com. Retrieved 8 August 2013

Bahrain
 
Airports
Airports
Bahrain